Sixteen ships of the Royal Navy have borne the name HMS Alert (or the variants Alerte and Alaart), while another was planned:

 , an 8-gun cutter in service from 1753 to 1754.
 , a 10-gun cutter launched at Dover in 1777, converted to a sloop in the same year, and captured in the Channel by the Junon in 1778; foundered December 1779 off the coast of America. French records show her serving as Alerte, a cutter of fourteen 4-pounder guns and valued as a prize at Lt 32,289.
 , a 10-gun cutter launched at Dover in 1778 and captured by the French frigate Diligente in September 1780 in the Bay of Biscay. The prize was valued at Lt52,405. In French service she was armed with six 8-pounder guns and twelve 18-pounder howitzers.  recaptured her in North American waters on 7 December 1781, after a strong resistance.
 , a 4-gun schooner purchased in 1790, wrecked in 1791, but possibly salved and broken up in 1799.
 , an 8-gun brig-sloop launched at Bombay in 1795.
 HMS Allart (1807) (or Alaart), a 16-gun Danish sloop captured in 1807 and retaken by the Danes in 1809. She was to be named Cassandra.
 , a  brig-sloop, launched in 1813 and sold in 1832.
 , an 8-gun packet-brig launched in 1835 at Rotherhithe and broken up in 1851.
 , an 8-gun brig, previously a slaver, captured in 1848 and sold 1850.
 , a wooden  screw sloop launched in 1856 at Pembroke Dock. She was converted for Arctic exploration in 1874, reached 82°N in the expedition of 1876, worked as a survey vessel, and was loaned to the US Navy and the Canadian Government.  She was laid up in 1884 and sold.
 , an  launched in 1894 at Sheerness. She was lent to the civil authority at Basra in 1918, and sold to them in 1926 for use as a pilot vessel. She was broken up in 1949.
 , a  launched in 1945, originally Dundrum Bay and Loch Scamadale. She was sold in 1971.

In addition, the Royal Navy used several hired armed vessels with the name Alert, including several cutters  and a lugger .

Citations

References
 
Demerliac, Alain (1996) La Marine De Louis XVI: Nomenclature Des Navires Français De 1774 À 1792. (Nice: Éditions OMEGA). 
 Fonds Marine. Campagnes (opérations ; divisions et stations navales ; missions diverses). Inventaire de la sous-série Marine BB4. Tome premier : BB4 1 à 209 (1790-1804) 
 Hepper, David J. (1994) British Warship Losses in the Age of Sail, 1650-1859. (Rotherfield: Jean Boudriot). 
 Roche, Jean-Michel (2005) Dictionnaire des Bâtiments de la Flotte de Guerre Française de Colbert à nos Jours. (Group Retozel-Maury Millau).
 

Royal Navy ship names